Sudan is a traditional Korean punch made with boiled grain cake balls and honeyed water. It is usually served during the summer for quenching thirst. Traditionally Sudan was always served during a village rite in 6th month in lunar calendar. Korean farmers prayed for a bountiful harvest and god's blessing for their life in the future by making food offering including foods and Sudan drink. It is sometimes considered a type of hwachae.

Hwachae made with rice (or other grain) cakes or rice (or other grain) balls are called sudan.
 Bori-sudan ("barley punch") – made with steamed barely, mung bean starch, and omija juice.
 Tteok-sudan ("rice cake punch") – garae-tteok made with thinly sliced garaetteok (tubed rice cake), mung bean starch, and honey.
 Wonso-byeong ("rice ball punch") – made with ball-shaped tteok with fillings of minced jujube or citrus jam floated in honeyed juice.

See also
 Baesuk – boiled pear punch
Hwachae
 Hwachae – fruit or flower punch
Shikhye
 Sikhye – rice punch
 Sujeonggwa – cinnamon punch

References 

Hwachae
Korean drinks
Korean rice dishes
Mixed drinks
Non-alcoholic drinks
Rice drinks